The Convention on the Conservation of Migratory Species of Wild Animals, also known as the Convention on Migratory Species (CMS) or the Bonn Convention, is an international agreement that aims to conserve migratory species throughout their ranges. The agreement was signed under the auspices of the United Nations Environment Programme and is concerned with conservation of wildlife and habitats on a global scale.

Signed in 1979 in Bonn, West Germany, the convention entered into force in 1983. As of September 2020, there are 131 Member States to the convention. The depositary is the Government of the Federal Republic of Germany.

The CMS is the only global, and United Nations-based, intergovernmental organization established exclusively for the conservation and management of terrestrial, aquatic and avian migratory species. The CMS, and its daughter agreements, determine policy and provide further guidance on specific issues through their strategic plans, action plans, resolutions, decisions and guidelines.

Fundamental principles
Fundamental Principles of the convention are set out in Article 2. The parties acknowledge the importance of migratory species being conserved and of range states agreeing to take action to this end "whenever possible and appropriate", "paying special attention to migratory species the conservation status of which is unfavourable and taking individually or in cooperation appropriate and necessary steps to conserve such species and their habitat." Further in Article 2(2) The parties "acknowledge" [but do not commit in stronger language, cf Art 2(3) "shall"] "the need to take action to avoid any migratory species becoming endangered".

Article 2(3) of the convention states that

the parties:

(a) Should promote, cooperate in and support research relating to migratory species;(b) Shall endeavour to provide immediate protection for migratory species included in Appendix I; and(c) Shall endeavour to conclude AGREEMENTS covering the conservation and management of migratory species included in Appendix II.

Parties to the convention

States parties 
The following are all parties to the convention, as of 1 January 2021:

Sovereign states

 
 
 
 
 
 
 
 
 
 
 
 
 
 
 
 
 
 
 
 
 
 
 
 
 
 
 
 
 
 
 
 
 
 
 
 
 
 
 
 
 
 
 
 
 
 
 
 
 
 
 
 
 
 
 
 
 
 
 
 
 
 
 
 
 
 
 
 
 
 
 
 
 
 
 
 
 
 
 
 
 
 
 
 
 
 
 
 
 
 
 
 
 
 
 
 
 
 
 
 
 
 
 
 
 
 
 
 
 
 
 
 
 
 
 
 
 
 
 
 
 
 
 
 
 
 
 
 
 

Other states/entities
 
 

Signed, but not ratified

Participating non-parties 
The following, while not parties to the convention, are party to one or more of the agreements and/or have signed one or more of the MOUs:

Sovereign states

 
 
 
 
 
 
 
 
 
 
 
 
 
 
 
 
 
 
 
 
 
 
 
 
 
 
 
 
 

Other states/entities

Species coverage
The CMS Family covers a great diversity of migratory species. The appendices of CMS include many mammals, including land mammals, marine mammals and bats; birds; fish; reptiles and one insect. Among the instruments, AEWA covers 254 species of birds that are ecologically dependent on wetlands for at least part of their annual cycle. EUROBATS covers 52 species of bat, the Memorandum of Understanding on the Conservation of Migratory Sharks seven species of shark, the IOSEA Marine Turtle MOU six species of marine turtle and the Raptors MoU 76 species of birds of prey.

Appendix I – Threatened migratory species
Migratory species threatened with extinction are listed on Appendix I of the convention, with relevant provisions outlined in Article III, paragraphs 4 and 5. Parties that are range states to Appendix I species are obliged to afford them strict protection. CMS parties strive towards strictly protecting these animals, conserving or restoring the places where they live, mitigating obstacles to migration and controlling other factors that might endanger them. Besides establishing obligations for each state joining the convention, CMS promotes concerted action among the range states of many of these species.

Appendix II – Migratory species requiring international cooperation
Migratory species that need or would significantly benefit from international co-operation are listed in Appendix II of the convention.  These species, either individually or by taxonomic group, are the basis for establishing instruments – regional or global – under CMS. For this reason, the convention encourages the range states to conclude global or regional agreements.

CMS instruments

Agreements 
The CMS acts as a framework convention and encourages its states parties to conclude global or regional agreements. Article V of the convention lays out what agreements agreed to under its auspices should include. These agreements are usually legally binding treaties that aim to "restore the migratory species concerned to a favorable conservation status or to maintain it in such a status." To date seven agreements have been signed, they are as follow:

 Agreement on the Conservation of Albatrosses and Petrels (ACAP)
 Agreement on the Conservation of Cetaceans of the Black Sea, Mediterranean Sea and Contiguous Atlantic Area (ACCOBAMS)
 Agreement on the Conservation of African-Eurasian Migratory Waterbirds (AEWA)
 Agreement on the Conservation of Small Cetaceans of the Baltic, North East Atlantic, Irish and North Seas (ASCOBANS)
 Agreement on the Conservation of Populations of European Bats (EUROBATS)
 Agreement on the Conservation of Gorillas and their Habitats (Gorilla Agreement)
 Agreement on the Conservation of Seals in the Wadden Sea (Wadden Sea Seals)

Memoranda of understanding (MOU) 
In addition, several memoranda of understanding (MOU) have also been concluded under the auspices of CMS. While not full agreements, these MOU still aim to conserve various migratory species. To date, 19 MOU have been signed. They are as follows:

 Memorandum of Understanding concerning Conservation Measures for the Aquatic Warbler
 Memorandum of Understanding concerning Conservation Measures for Marine Turtles of the Atlantic Coast of Africa
 Memorandum of Understanding on the Conservation of Migratory Birds of Prey in Africa and Eurasia
 Memorandum of Understanding concerning Conservation and Restoration of the Bukhara Deer
 Memorandum of Understanding on the Conservation and Management of Dugongs and their Habitats throughout their Range
 Memorandum of Understanding on the Conservation of High Andean Flamingos and their Habitats
 Memorandum of Understanding on the Conservation and Management of Marine Turtles and their Habitats of the Indian Ocean and South-East Asia
 Memorandum of Understanding on the Conservation and Management of the Middle-European Population of the Great Bustard
 Memorandum of Understanding concerning Conservation Measures for the Eastern Atlantic Populations of the Mediterranean Monk Seal
 Memorandum of Understanding for the Conservation of Cetaceans and their Habitats in the Pacific Islands Region
 Memorandum of Understanding between the Republic of Argentine and the Republic of Chile on the Conservation of the Ruddy-headed Goose
 Memorandum of Understanding concerning Conservation, Restoration and Sustainable Use of the Saiga Antelope
 Memorandum of Understanding on the Conservation of Migratory Sharks
 Memorandum of Understanding concerning Conservation Measures for the Siberian Crane
 Memorandum of Understanding concerning Conservation Measures for the Slender-billed Curlew
 Memorandum of Understanding between the Argentine Republic and the Republic of Chile on the Conservation of the Southern Huemul
 Memorandum of Understanding on the Conservation of Southern South American Migratory Grassland Bird Species and their Habitats
 Memorandum of Understanding concerning Conservation Measures for the West African Populations of the African Elephant
 Memorandum of Understanding concerning the Conservation of the Manatee and Small Cetaceans of Western Africa and Macaronesia

Organizational structure

Conference of the Parties (COP) 
The Conference of the Parties of the CMS acts as its principal decision-making body. It is composed of all states parties to the convention, as well as any observers that wish to participate in the proceedings of the conference. COPs are held at least every three years.

The functions of the COP are enumerated in Article VII of the convention. At conferences, the states parties review the implementation of this convention, as well as approve all financial regulations of the convention.

Standing committee (StC)  
The Standing Committee is responsible for carrying out interim activities on behalf of the Conference of the Parties in between its meetings. The Committee meets at least once a year. It also usually meets immediately before and after any COPs.

The functions of the Standing Committee were established by Resolution 1.1 of COP 1 in 1985. However, in 2008 at COP 9, the makeup of the Standing Committee was overhauled. Under Resolution 9.15 the composition of the committee, as well as its functions we updated. Its updated functions include:

 To ensure that decisions of the COP are implemented
 To monitor the budget
 To make recommendations for consideration by the next COP
 To provide advice and guidance to the secretariat
 To represent the COP in negotiations with the Host Government and UNEP with regard to the secretariat
 To act as a bureau at the COP
 To undertake any other ad hoc task assigned to it by the COP.

The committee is composed of 15 members who are elected to serve three-year terms, or from the end of one COP until the end of the next. Alternate members are also selected. Under Resolution 9.15, the composition is as follows:
 Three members from each of the geographic regions of Africa and Europe,
 Two members from each of the geographic regions of Asia and South and Central America and the Caribbean,
 One member from each of the geographic regions of North America and Oceania;
 The Depositary, and Host Government of the secretariat
 The Host Government of the next and previous meetings of the COP

Scientific Council (ScC) 
The main objective of the Scientific Council is to provide advice on scientific matters to CMS bodies, as well as CMS states parties. The council makes recommendations to the COP issues such as research on migratory species, specific conservation and management measures, the inclusion of migratory species in the Appendices and designation of species for Concerted or Cooperative Actions under the convention.

The functions of the Scientific Council are enumerated in Article VIII of the convention. However, it was not established until 1985 under Resolution 1.4 of COP 1. Each state party is entitled to appoint one qualified expert as a member of the Scientific Council, as well as one alternate scientific councillor. Additionally, the COP may also appoint to the council other experts to cover fields of particular interest to the convention.

Sessional Committee 
In 2014, at COP 11, a new sub-body of the Scientific Council was created via Resolution 11.4. This representative selection of the membership of the Scientific Council is called the Sessional Committee. It is composed of nine COP-appointed councillors, as well as fifteen party-appointed councillors (three from Africa; three from Asia; three from Europe; three from Oceania; three from South and Central America and the Caribbean).

The Sessional Committee works during the intersessional period between two consecutive meetings of the COP, and is responsible for the implementation of the mandate assigned to the Scientific Council by the COP. All work done by the Sessional Committee is considered work of the Scientific Council.

Secretariat 
THE CMS secretariat acts as the convention's coordinating body. The CMS Secretariat is provided and administered by the United Nations Environment Programme.

The functions of the secretariat are laid out in Article IX of the convention. They include: arranging for and servicing meetings of the COP, Scientific Council and Standing Committee, maintaining liaison between the states parties, disseminating information that furthers the objectives and implementation CMS, preparing COP reports, promote the conclusion of CMS Agreements, among other functions.

The secretariat has been based in Bonn, Germany, since its creation, but was relocated to the United Nations Campus in Bonn in 1998. Additionally, since 2009, the secretariat also maintains an out-post office in Abu Dhabi, United Arab Emirates. The Abu Dhabi office oversees implementation of the MOU on the Conservation of Migratory Birds of Prey in Africa and Eurasia, and the MOU on the Conservation and Management of Dugongs and their Habitats throughout their range. The office is hosted by the Environment Agency – Abu Dhabi.

The current executive secretary of the convention is Amy Fraenkel.

Implementation

Reporting
Article 6(3) requires parties which are range states for migratory species listed in Appendix I or II to inform the CoP through the secretariat, at least six months prior to each ordinary meeting of the conference, on measures that they are taking to implement the convention for these species.

Domestic legislation
To varying degrees the Bonn Convention has been incorporated into domestic law by the parties.

See also
 Animal migration
 Highly migratory species
 Memorandum of Understanding on the Conservation of Migratory Birds of Prey in Africa and Eurasia (Raptors MoU)
 Memorandum of Understanding concerning Conservation Measures for the West African Populations of the African Elephant
 Memorandum of Understanding concerning Conservation Measures for the Aquatic Warbler
 Memorandum of Understanding concerning Conservation and Restoration of the Bukhara Deer
 Memorandum of Understanding for the Conservation of Cetaceans and Their Habitats in the Pacific Island Region
 Memorandum of Understanding on the Conservation and Management of Middle-European Populations of the Great Bustard
 Memorandum of Understanding on the Conservation of High Andean Flamingos and their Habitats
 Memorandum of Understanding concerning Conservation Measures for Marine Turtles of the Atlantic Coast of Africa
 Memorandum of Understanding concerning Conservation Measures for the Eastern Atlantic Populations of the Mediterranean Monk Seal
 Memorandum of Understanding concerning Conservation Measures for the Ruddy-headed Goose
 Memorandum of Understanding Concerning Conservation, Restoration and Sustainable Use of the Saiga Antelope
 Memorandum of Understanding on the Conservation of Southern South American Migratory Grassland Bird Species and Their Habitats
 Memorandum of Understanding Concerning Conservation Measures for the Siberian Crane
 Memorandum of Understanding on the Conservation of the South Andean Huemul
 Memorandum of Understanding Concerning the Conservation of the Manatee and mall Cetaceans of Western Africa and Macaronesia
 Convention on Biological Diversity
 Convention on the International Trade in Endangered Species of Wild Flora and Fauna (CITES)
 List of international environmental agreements
 Ramsar Convention
 Japan–Australia Migratory Bird Agreement

References

External links

Convention on Migratory Species
Bonn Convention – Appendices I and II
Ratifications

 
Environmental treaties
Wildlife conservation
Wildlife law
Treaties concluded in 1979
Treaties entered into force in 1983
1983 in the environment
1979 in West Germany
Treaties of Albania
Treaties of Algeria
Treaties of Angola
Treaties of Antigua and Barbuda
Treaties of Argentina
Treaties of Armenia
Treaties of Australia
Treaties of Austria
Treaties of Bangladesh
Treaties of Belarus
Treaties of Belgium
Treaties of the People's Republic of Benin
Treaties of Bolivia
Treaties of Bulgaria
Treaties of Burkina Faso
Treaties of Burundi
Treaties of Cameroon
Treaties of Cape Verde
Treaties of Chad
Treaties of Chile
Treaties of the Republic of the Congo
Treaties of the Cook Islands
Treaties of Costa Rica
Treaties of Ivory Coast
Treaties of Croatia
Treaties of Cuba
Treaties of Cyprus
Treaties of the Czech Republic
Treaties of Zaire
Treaties of Denmark
Treaties of Djibouti
Treaties of Ecuador
Treaties of Egypt
Treaties of Equatorial Guinea
Treaties of Eritrea
Treaties of Estonia
Treaties of Ethiopia
Treaties entered into by the European Union
Treaties of Fiji
Treaties of Finland
Treaties of France
Treaties of Gabon
Treaties of the Gambia
Treaties of Georgia (country)
Treaties of West Germany
Treaties of Ghana
Treaties of Greece
Treaties of Guinea
Treaties of Guinea-Bissau
Treaties of Honduras
Treaties of the Hungarian People's Republic
Treaties of India
Treaties of Iran
Treaties of Ireland
Treaties of Israel
Treaties of Italy
Treaties of Jordan
Treaties of Kazakhstan
Treaties of Kenya
Treaties of Latvia
Treaties of Liberia
Treaties of the Libyan Arab Jamahiriya
Treaties of Liechtenstein
Treaties of Lithuania
Treaties of Luxembourg
Treaties of Madagascar
Treaties of Mali
Treaties of Malta
Treaties of Mauritania
Treaties of Mauritius
Treaties of Monaco
Treaties of Mongolia
Treaties of Montenegro
Treaties of Morocco
Treaties of Mozambique
Treaties of the Netherlands
Treaties of New Zealand
Treaties of Niger
Treaties of Nigeria
Treaties of Norway
Treaties of Pakistan
Treaties of Palau
Treaties of Panama
Treaties of Paraguay
Treaties of Peru
Treaties of the Philippines
Treaties of Poland
Treaties of Portugal
Treaties of Moldova
Treaties of Romania
Treaties of Rwanda
Treaties of Samoa
Treaties of São Tomé and Príncipe
Treaties of Saudi Arabia
Treaties of Senegal
Treaties of Serbia
Treaties of Seychelles
Treaties of Slovakia
Treaties of Slovenia
Treaties of the Somali Democratic Republic
Treaties of South Africa
Treaties of Spain
Treaties of Sri Lanka
Treaties of Eswatini
Treaties of Sweden
Treaties of Switzerland
Treaties of Syria
Treaties of Tajikistan
Treaties of North Macedonia
Treaties of Togo
Treaties of Tunisia
Treaties of Uganda
Treaties of Ukraine
Treaties of the United Kingdom
Treaties of Tanzania
Treaties of Uruguay
Treaties of Uzbekistan
Treaties of Vietnam
Treaties of Yemen
Treaties of Zimbabwe
Treaties extended to Aruba
Treaties extended to the Netherlands Antilles
Treaties extended to Hong Kong
Treaties extended to the Faroe Islands
Treaties extended to Akrotiri and Dhekelia
Treaties extended to Bermuda
Treaties extended to the British Indian Ocean Territory
Treaties extended to the British Virgin Islands
Treaties extended to the Cayman Islands
Treaties extended to the Falkland Islands
Treaties extended to Gibraltar
Treaties extended to Guernsey
Treaties extended to Jersey
Treaties extended to the Isle of Man
Treaties extended to Montserrat
Treaties extended to the Pitcairn Islands
Treaties extended to Saint Helena, Ascension and Tristan da Cunha
Treaties extended to the Turks and Caicos Islands